Ahr is a river in Germany, a left tributary of the Rhine. After  it crosses from North Rhine-Westphalia into Rhineland-Palatinate.

The Ahr flows through Ahr valley or Ahrtal, passing through the towns of Schuld, Altenahr and Bad Neuenahr-Ahrweiler. The Ahr has a gradient of 0.4 percent in its lower course, and 0.4 to 0.8 percent in its upper course.

The Ahr and its tributaries are a main drainage system of the eastern Eifel.

History 
There were isolated settlements in the Ahr valley beginning at the latest in Roman times, evidenced by the Roman villa near Ahrweiler. Owing to their isolated location, the upper and middle parts of the course were sparsely populated.

That began changing in the mid-19th century. The development of settlements and transportation routes (including three railway lines) and the expansion of the area used for agriculture in the Ahr valley led to the narrowing and constraint of the riverbed. The course of the river was graded and its banks were stabilized.

Catastrophic flash flooding occurred on the Ahr in 1910 and 2021 resulting in the deaths of hundreds.

Course 
It then flows through the Schwanenweiher pond below Blankenheim Castle.

The stream, which runs in a south-easterly direction, through the valley meadows of upper Ahr valley, has not cut very deeply into the heights of the Eifel. Much of the upper Ahr valley is protected and follows the B 258 federal road. Below the hamlet of Ahrdorf in the municipality of Blankenheim, the Ahr reaches its southernmost point and enters the state of Rhineland-Palatine. From Müsch via Antweiler to Fuchshofen, the river runs northwards and turns east at Schuld heading through Insul to Dümpelfeld. Here, the Ahr collects the waters of the Adenauer Bach coming from the right and flowing in a northeasterly direction. In Altenahr, the valley bends to the east and initially follows a very winding course. Here the river is accompanied by the B 267, although it does not follow every loop in the river. In Altenahr, the largest bend in the river beings; it is protected because of its flora and fauna. From here, the valley becomes a gorge bordered by the steep cliffs of the Ahr Hills. From Reimerzhoven the valley sides are dominated by vineyards, especially on the south-facing slopes north of the river, particularly around the villages of Mayschoß, Rech, Dernau and Marienthal. The last narrow point in the Ahr valley occurs below the Bunte Kuh ("coloured cow"), a rock formation that almost reaches the river and leaves little room for road and railway. In Walporzheim, the valley widens abruptly, and the Ahr passes through the county town of Bad Neuenahr. In Heimersheim, the vineyards end. The valley floor between Bad Bodendorf on the northern side and Sinzig on a terrace in the south is dominated by agriculture and fruit and vegetable growing.

Since being re-naturalised (from 1979, see aerial photographs) it has been one of the few natural river mouths on the Rhine and is under protection.

Tributaries 

The tributaries of the Ahr include (in upstream order):

Tributaries with a length of over 7 km (from source to mouth):
Left tributaries are in dark blue; right tributaries in light blue.

Viticulture 

The Ahr is well known for the many vineyards that grace the hillsides downstream of the village of Altenahr. The small Ahr wine region is nevertheless the largest contiguous red wine-growing area in Germany, noted especially for wines made from the Spätburgunder (Pinot noir) grape. The Red Wine Trail runs through the southern slopes of the lower Ahr Valley, passing inter alia the former government bunker.

See also 
 Golden Mile (Rhineland-Palatinate), the fertile plain at the mouth of the Ahr
 List of rivers of Rhineland-Palatinate
 List of rivers of North Rhine-Westphalia

References

External links

 AhrtalGuide.com Pictures of this region 
 Ahr  2000  

 
Rivers of North Rhine-Westphalia
Rivers of Rhineland-Palatinate
Rivers of the Eifel
Rivers of Germany